5-enolpyruvylshikimate-3-phosphate (EPSP) synthase is an enzyme produced by plants and microorganisms. EPSPS catalyzes the chemical reaction:

phosphoenolpyruvate (PEP) + 3-phospho shikimate (S3P)  phosphate + 5-enolpyruvylshikimate-3-phosphate (EPSP)

Thus, the two substrates of this enzyme are phosphoenolpyruvate (PEP) and 3-phosphoshikimate, whereas its two products are phosphate and 5-enolpyruvylshikimate-3-phosphate.

This enzyme is not present in the genomes of animals.  It presents an attractive biological target for herbicides, such as glyphosate. A glyphosate-resistant version of this gene has been used in genetically modified crops.

Nomenclature 

The enzyme belongs to the family of transferases, to be specific those transferring aryl or alkyl groups other than methyl groups.  The systematic name of this enzyme class is phosphoenolpyruvate:3-phosphoshikimate 5-O-(1-carboxyvinyl)-transferase. Other names in common use include:

 5-enolpyruvylshikimate-3-phosphate synthase,
 3-enolpyruvylshikimate 5-phosphate synthase,
 3-enolpyruvylshikimic acid-5-phosphate synthetase,
 5′-enolpyruvylshikimate-3-phosphate synthase,
 5-enolpyruvyl-3-phosphoshikimate synthase,
 5-enolpyruvylshikimate-3-phosphate synthetase,
 5-enolpyruvylshikimate-3-phosphoric acid synthase,
 enolpyruvylshikimate phosphate synthase, and
 3-phosphoshikimate 1-carboxyvinyl transferase.

Structure 

EPSP synthase is a monomeric enzyme with a molecular mass of about 46,000. It is composed of two domains, which are joined by protein strands.  This strand acts as a hinge, and can bring the two protein domains closer together.  When a substrate binds to the enzyme, ligand bonding causes the two parts of the enzyme to clamp down around the substrate in the active site.

EPSP synthase has been divided into two groups according to glyphosate sensitivity. Class I enzyme, contained in plants and in some bacteria, is inhibited at low micromolar glyphosate concentrations, whereas class II enzyme, found in other bacteria, is resistant to inhibition by glyphosate.

Shikimate pathway 

EPSP synthase participates in the biosynthesis of the aromatic amino acids phenylalanine, tyrosine, and tryptophan via the  shikimate pathway in bacteria, fungi, and plants.  EPSP synthase is produced only by plants and micro-organisms; the gene coding for it is not in the mammalian genome. Gut flora of some animals contain EPSPS.

Reaction 

EPSP synthase catalyzes the reaction which converts shikimate-3-phosphate plus phosphoenolpyruvate to 5-enolpyruvylshikimate-3-phosphate (EPSP) by way of an acetal-like tetrahedral intermediate. Basic and amino acids in the active site are involved in deprotonation of the hydroxyl group of PEP and in the proton-exchange steps related to the tetrahedral intermediate itself, respectively.

Studies of the enzyme kinetics for this reaction have determined the specific sequence and energetics of each step of the process.

Herbicide target

EPSP synthase is the biological target for the herbicide glyphosate.  Glyphosate is a competitive inhibitor of EPSP synthase, acting as a transition state analog that binds more tightly to the EPSPS-S3P complex than PEP and inhibits the shikimate pathway. This binding leads to inhibition of the enzyme's catalysis and shuts down the pathway. Eventually this results in organism death from lack of aromatic amino acids the organism requires to survive.

A version of the enzyme that both was resistant to glyphosate and that was still efficient enough to drive adequate plant growth was identified by Monsanto scientists after much trial and error in an Agrobacterium strain called CP4.  The strain CP4 was found surviving in a waste-fed column at a glyphosate production facility.  The CP4 EPSP synthase enzyme has been engineered into several genetically modified crops.

References

Further reading 

 
 

EC 2.5.1
Enzymes of known structure